San Cesario di Lecce is a railway station in San Cesario di Lecce, Italy. The station is located on the Lecce–Otranto railway. The train services and the railway infrastructure are operated by Ferrovie del Sud Est.

Train services
The station is served by the following service(s):

Local services (Treno regionale) Lecce - Zollino - Nardo - Gallipoli

References

Railway stations in Apulia
Buildings and structures in the Province of Lecce